Hans Bodo Gerhardt Wehr (5 July 1909, Leipzig24 May 1981, Münster) was a German Arabist. A professor at the University of Münster from 1957–1974, he published the Arabisches Wörterbuch (1952), which was later published in an English edition as A Dictionary of Modern Written Arabic, edited by J Milton Cowan. For the dictionary Wehr created a transliteration scheme to represent the Arabic alphabet. The latest edition of the dictionary was published in 1995 and is Arabic–German only.

Wehr joined the Nazi Party in 1940, and wrote an essay arguing that the German government should ally with "the Arabs" against England and France. The dictionary project was funded by the Nazi government, which intended to use it to translate Adolf Hitler's Mein Kampf into Arabic.

References

1909 births
1981 deaths
Linguists from Germany
German Arabists
German orientalists
Academic staff of the University of Münster
Writers from Leipzig
20th-century linguists